Diez is a Verbandsgemeinde ("collective municipality") in the Rhein-Lahn-Kreis, in Rhineland-Palatinate, Germany. Its seat is in Diez.

The Verbandsgemeinde Diez consists of the following Ortsgemeinden ("local municipalities"):

Verbandsgemeinde in Rhineland-Palatinate
Rhein-Lahn-Kreis